Calgary-Elbow is a provincial electoral district for the Legislative Assembly of Alberta, Canada.  Its most recent MLA was Doug Schweitzer, who won the seat in the 2019 provincial election. Schweitzer stepped down on August 31, 2022 and the electoral district (often commonly referred to as “riding”) is currently unrepresented.

The riding was created in 1971 from the southeast part of Calgary-Glenmore and the southwest Part of the old Calgary South riding.

Includes the communities of: Altadore, Bel-Aire, Britannia, Elbow Park, Elboya, Erlton, Garrison Woods, Glamorgan, Lincoln Park, Mount Royal, Marda Loop, Mayfair, Meadowlark Park, North Glenmore, Parkhill, Rideau Park, Roxboro, South Calgary and Windsor Park.

History
The electoral district was created in the 1971 boundary redistribution out of the electoral districts of Calgary Glenmore, Calgary South and Calgary Victoria Park.

The 2010 boundary redistribution saw significant changes to the riding. All territory south of Glenmore Trail was moved to Calgary-Glenmore & the northern boundary shifted, exchanging and losing many different portions of the riding with Calgary-Currie and Calgary-Buffalo.

Boundary history

Representation history

The electoral district of Calgary-Elbow was created in the boundary redistribution of 1971 from Calgary Glenmore, Calgary South and Calgary Victoria Park. The first election saw architect and former Calgary Victoria Park Progressive Conservative incumbent and Calgary Alderman David Russell run for re-election. He won a hotly contested race over Social Credit candidate L.A. “Chick” Thorssen to pick up the new district for his party.

Upon being elected Russell was appointed into the cabinet of Premier Peter Lougheed. He ran for re-election in 1975 and defeated future Senator Sharon Carstairs in a landslide victory. He would be re-elected with large majorities three more times while continuing to serve in various cabinet portfolios. He would be appointed Deputy Premier by Don Getty in 1985. Russell retired from the legislature in 1989.

The second representative in the riding was former Mayor of Calgary Ralph Klein who, following a party nomination win over business-person Fran Drummond, was elected to his first term in 1989. Klein would win the leadership of the Progressive Conservatives in 1992 and become Premier of the province. He would hold the premiership until December 2006 before resigning his seat in 2007. In total, Klein was re-elected in the Elbow electoral district four times.

A hotly contested by-election was held on June 12, 2007. The winner was Alberta Liberal candidate Craig Cheffins who managed an upset win over well-known local business person Brian Heninger.

The 2008 general election saw Cheffins defeated as Progressive Conservative candidate Alison Redford won back the riding for her party. She was promoted to cabinet by Premier Ed Stelmach following the election.

Redford became Premier of Alberta and leader of the Progressive Conservative party after winning the 2011 Progressive Conservative leadership race. She was re-elected in the 2012 provincial election, but stepped down in 2014 following significant internal party unrest about her leadership.

Calgary-Elbow was one of four provincial seats won by the Progressive Conservatives in the  2014 Alberta by-elections. Former Calgary school board chair and Saskatchewan MLA Gordon Dirks took Calgary-Elbow in this by-election.

In the 2015 provincial election Greg Clark, the leader of the Alberta Party, was elected MLA, defeating incumbent MLA and Education minister Gordon Dirks. While Clark had a modest showing in the 2012 election, his strong local connections gave him healthy numbers in the 2014 by-election and foreshadowed his 2015 win.  Clark led the Alberta Party between 2013 and 2017, stepping down as leader prior to the 2019 general election.

A general election was called in April 2019, with recently nominated United Conservative Party representative Doug Schweitzer defeating Greg Clark.  Schweitzer was named to cabinet of the governing Jason Kenney led UCP, first as Justice Minister and later as Minister of Jobs, Economy and Innovation.  In a series of announcements, Schweitzer in May, 2022 stated he would not seek re-election in 2023,  subsequently resigning from cabinet  and finally stepping down as MLA on August 31, 2022, leaving the riding vacant. With some uncertainty in the legislation governing the timing of provincial by-elections, Premier Jason Kenney side-stepped the issue confirming he would leave the matter of a possible by-election to his successor, following the UCP leadership vote on October 6, 2022.

Election results

Graphical Summary

2019 general election

2015 general election

2014 by-election

2012 general election

2008 general election

2007 by-election

2004 general election

2001 general election

1997 general election

1993 general election

1989 general election

1986 general election

1982 general election

1979 general election

1975 general election

1971 general election

Senate nominee results

2004 Senate nominee election district results

Voters had the option of selecting 4 Candidates on the Ballot

2012 Senate nominee election district results

References
  
 
 
 
 
 
 
 
 
 
 
 
 
"Calgary-Elbow Official Results 2019 Alberta general election" Elections Alberta. Retrieved April 26, 2019.

External links
The Legislative Assembly of Alberta

Alberta provincial electoral districts
Politics of Calgary